Nowaki may refer to:

Nowaki, Masovian Voivodeship (east-central Poland)
Nowaki, Opole Voivodeship (south-west Poland)
Nowaki, Warmian-Masurian Voivodeship (north Poland)
Nowaki (novel), a short Japanese novel by Natsume Sōseki (1867-1916) 
Japanese destroyer Nowaki